Jaime Anne Jamgochian is a contemporary Christian music singer and songwriter.

Biography 

Jaime Jamgochian is a Christian singer songwriter and worship leader based in Nashville, Tennessee.  
Jaime grew up in Reading, Massachusetts. She began playing piano by ear at a young age. Throughout high school, she took lessons, performed and competed in numerous competitions. Jamgochian earned a scholarship to Berklee School of Music. While in college, a friend told her about Jesus Christ, and she began to study the Bible and attend a local church. Shortly after graduating, she took an internship at The City Church in Seattle, Washington. She ended up staying there for seven years, where she got involved in missions and outreach programs.

Music career 

While in Seattle, Jaime connected with Centricity Music, and was signed as one of their first artists. She released her first album, Reason to Live, under Centricity Music. She was able to co-write the album with a number of influential songwriters and friends, David Zaffiro, Gary Sadler, and Sam Mizell. Above the Noise was produced in part by Nathan Nockels. while remaining honest and humble.

Discography

Studio albums
Jaime (2003)
Reason to Live (2004; re-released 2006)
Reason to Re-Mix EP (2004)
Hear My Worship EP (2007)
Above the Noise (2008)
Modest is Hottest (2015)
Christmastime EP (2015) (with Tyrus Morgan)

Compilation albums
Bethlehem Skyline (2006)

Singles
 "The Stand" (2011)
 "Everything You Are" (2012)

References 

Living people
Christian music songwriters
Centricity Music artists
American women singer-songwriters
Performers of contemporary Christian music
American performers of Christian music
1983 births
Musicians from Nashville, Tennessee
Berklee College of Music alumni
Singer-songwriters from Tennessee
21st-century American singers
21st-century American women singers